Trichilia hispida is a species of plant in the family Meliaceae. It is found in Brazil and Peru. It is threatened by habitat loss.

References

hispida
Endemic flora of Brazil
Endemic flora of Peru
Trees of Brazil
Trees of Peru
Vulnerable flora of South America
Taxonomy articles created by Polbot